Marek Szemoński (born 14 July 1976) is a retired Polish football striker.

References

1976 births
Living people
Polish footballers
Górnik Zabrze players
Widzew Łódź players
Lech Poznań players
Szczakowianka Jaworzno players
Polonia Bytom players
Association football forwards